Harry Benham (February 26, 1884 – July 17, 1969) was an American silent film actor.

Background

Benham was born in Valparaiso, Indiana. As a child, he and his family moved to Chicago, where he was raised and attended school. Benham had a talent for singing and sang in his local church choir.

In 1904, the production Peggy From Paris came to Chicago and, at age 20, Benham became a member of the chorus while earning a living in the wholesale paper business.

Benham was soon selected to play the leading role in the production and remained in that role throughout the production's three-year run. He was subsequently able to garner more roles in other plays, such as The Sultan of Sulu, Woodland, Marrying Mary, The Gay Musician, 
H.M.S. Pinafore, Florodora, The Mayoress, and Madame Sherry.

In 1910 Benham joined the Thanhouser Company in New Rochelle, New York, for whom he played the leading role in many of the company's films through 1915.   He married actress Ethyle Cooke, and together they had two children, Dorothy and Leland, who also became prominent Thanhouser personalities.

Benham died on July 17, 1969 in Sarasota, Florida, aged 85.

An article about his role in Dr. Jekyll and Mr. Hyde (1912) appeared in Famous Monsters of Filmland (October 1963).

Filmography

1910s
 The Old Curiosity Shop (1911)
 The Mummy (1911)
 The Regimental Ball (1911)
 Get Rich Quick (1911) .... Undetermined Role
 The Rescue of Mr. Henpeck (1911) .... Mr. Henpeck
 The Smuggler (1911) .... The Secret Service Man
 David Copperfield (1911)
 The Satyr and the Lady (1911) .... The Artist
 Their Burglar (1911) .... Jack
 The Missing Heir (1911) .... The Policeman
 The Lady from the Sea (1911)
 The Tomboy (1911) .... The Guardian
 Cinderella (1911) .... The Prince
 She (1911)
 The Expert's Report (1911) .... The Oil Expert
 Dr. Jekyll and Mr. Hyde (1912) (uncredited) .... Mr. Hyde (some scenes)
 Her Ladyship's Page (1912)
 East Lynne (1912)
 The Poacher (1912) .... The Poacher
 Nicholas Nickleby (1912) .... Nicholas Nickleby
 An Easy Mark (1912) .... The Crook
 The Baby Bride (1912) .... The Bachelor
 Dora Thorne (1912) .... Lord Rowland
 Jilted (1912) .... The Fiancé
 Her Secret (1912) .... The Loyal Sister's Husband
 Why Tom Signed the Pledge (1912) .... Tom, the Deacon's Son
 In Blossom Time (1912)
 The Professor's Son (1912) .... The Professor
 Out of the Dark (1912)
 Under Two Flags (1912/I)
 The Finger of Scorn (1912) .... The Drummer
 The Portrait of Lady Anne (1912) .... Lady Anne's Suitor in 1912
 The Merchant of Venice (1912) .... Bassanio
 Big Sister (1912)
 The Wrecked Taxi (1912)
 When a Count Counted (1912) .... The Young Law Clerk, Her Sweetheart
 The Voice of Conscience (1912) .... Suitor
 Letters of a Lifetime (1912) .... The Brother
 The Warning (1912) .... The Father
 Miss Robinson Crusoe (1912) .... The American
 Dotty, the Dancer (1912) .... Mademoiselle Cleo
 In a Garden (1912) .... The Quarrel Maker
 The Ladder of Life (1912) .... The Poor Man, as an Adult
 A Noise Like a Fortune (1912) .... The Young Farmer
 In Time of Peril (1912) .... The Engineer
 Miss Taku of Tokyo (1912) .... Jack, the Son
 The Forest Rose (1912)
 A Romance of the U.S.N. (1912) .... The Sailor
 At Liberty—Good Press Agent (1912) .... The Press Agent
 Aurora Floyd (1912) .... John Mellish, Aurora's Second Husband
 Brains vs. Brawn (1912) .... Brawn/The Young Athlete
 The Repeater (1912) .... Jack, the Repeater
 The Star of Bethlehem (1912) .... Angel Gabriel
 The Boomerang (1913/III) .... The Father
 Sherlock Holmes Solves the Sign of the Four (1913) .... Sherlock Holmes
 Just a Shabby Doll (1913) .... The Husband
 King René's Daughter (1913)
 Little Dorrit (1913)
 The Girl of the Cabaret (1913)
 The Medium's Nemesis (1913)
 Robin Hood (1913) .... Alan-a-Dale
 Moths (1913) .... Correze
 The Children's Hour (1913)
 He Couldn't Lose (1913)
 Baby's Joy Ride (1913)
 A Clothes-Line Quarrel (1913)
 What Might Have Been (1913)
 A Beauty Parlor Graduate (1913)
 An Orphan's Romance (1913)
 Pamela Congreve (1914)
 Frou Frou (1914) .... Henri de Sartorys
 Their Golden Wedding (1914)
 The Runaway Princess (1914)
 Coals of Fire (1914)
 Her Love Letters (1914)
 The Elevator Man (1914)
 The Success of Selfishness (1914)
 The Golden Cross (1914)
 The Scientist's Doll (1914)
 The Miser's Reversion (1914)
 When Sorrow Fades (1914)
 Repentance (1914)
 The Musician's Daughter (1914)
 The Infant Heart Snatcher (1914)
 A Woman's Loyalty (1914)
 Was She Right in Forgiving Him? (1914)
 Rivalry (1914)
 The Girl Across the Hall (1914)
 The Man Without Fear (1914)
 The Harlow Handicap (1914) .... Harry Allen
 Harry's Waterloo (1914)
 Stronger Than Death (1914)
 Gold (1914)
 The Mettle of a Man (1914)
 The Harvest of Regrets (1914)
 The Trail of the Love-Lorn (1914)
 The Rescue (1914/I)
 Zudora (1914) .... John Storm
 Mrs. Van Ruyter's Stratagem (1914)
 Graft vs. Love (1915)
 The Heart of the Princess Marsari (1915)
 Daughter of Kings (1915)
 The Girl of the Sea (1915)
 A Freight Car Honeymoon (1915)
 The Country Girl (1915) .... Belville, Phyllis' Lover
 Madame Blanche, Beauty Doctor (1915) .... Bob; Madame Blanche
 His Two Patients (1915) .... The Doctor
 When the Fleet Sailed (1915)
 When Hungry Hamlet Fled (1915)
 Helen's Babies (1915)
 The Scoop at Bellville (1915)
 The Man Inside (1916) .... Hunter
 The Path of Happiness (1916) .... Merrill Day, the Intruder
 The Doll Doctor (1916)
 Mignonette (1916)
 Held for Damages (1916)
 Through Flames to Love (1916)
 The Capital Prize (1916)
 Her Wonderful Secret (1916)
 A College Boomerang (1916)
 The Heart Wrecker (1916)
 Peggy and the Law (1916)
 The Clever Mrs. Carter (1916)
 The Little Grey Mouse (1916) .... Jack Stanley
 Love's Masquerade (1916)
 The Angel of the Attic (1916)
 The Girl Who Didn't Tell (1916)
 The Mischief Maker (1916) .... Al Tourney
 Pamela's Past (1916)
 Toto of the Byways (1916)
 Souls United (1917)
 When Thieves Fall Out (1917)
 The Dancer's Peril (1917) .... Richard Moraino
 The Warfare of the Flesh (1917) .... Frank Gregory
 When You and I Were Young (1917) .... Artist
 The Last of the Carnabys (1917) .... Johnn Rand
 Putting the Bee in Herbert (1917) .... Herbert Macklin
 The Outsider (1917) .... Donald Lyttleton
 The Victim (1917) .... Undetermined Role
 Convict 993 (1918) .... Rodney Travers
 Cecilia of the Pink Roses (1918) .... Harry Twombly
 The Love Craze (1918)

1920s
 The Prey (1920) .... James Calvin
 For Love or Money (1920) .... John T. Hamilton
 The Dangerous Paradise (1920) .... Norman Kent
 Polly With a Past (1920) .... Clay Cullum
 Hush Money (1921) .... Bishop Deems
 The Road to Arcady (1922) .... John T. Hamilton
 Your Best Friend (1922) .... Robert Meyers
 The Town That Forgot God (1922) .... Harry Adams

External links

1884 births
1969 deaths
Male actors from Chicago
American male film actors
American male silent film actors
Male actors from Indiana
Actors from Sarasota, Florida
People from Valparaiso, Indiana
20th-century American male actors
20th-century American singers
20th-century American male singers